Gotita de amor (Droplet of Love) (known as Chabelita in some territories) is a Mexican telenovela produced by Nicandro Díaz González for Televisa in 1998. Is a remake of 1978 Brazilian telenovela Pingo de gente.

On Monday, 3 August 1998, Canal de las Estrellas started broadcasting Gotita de amor weekdays at 4:00pm, replacing Una luz en el camino. The last episode was broadcast on Friday, 20 November 1998 with El diario de Daniela replacing it the following day.

Laura Flores and Alejandro Ibarra starred as protagonists, while Pilar Montenegro, Isaura Espinoza, María Clara Zurita, Mercedes Molto, Raúl Araiza and Miguel de León starred as main antagonist. Andrea Lagunés starred as Isabel Arredondo de Santiago, the main child character that the show's name refers to (the Droplet of Love).

Plot
Left at the door of an orphanage just a few days after birth, Isabel "Chabelita" has grown in a shady atmosphere and with lack of affection. Her short life has been even harder because of constant mistreatment she has received from the strict director of the institution.

In spite of the difficult experiences that Chabelita has lived through, her spirit is up and she is very optimistic. She has an almost magic ability to unite people, and her enthusiasm is contagious. When she was told that her father lives in the Mexico City, Chabelita escapes from the orphanage to find him.

This is the beginning of the adventures of this wonderful girl, who, while she looks for her family, brings love to all lonely and needed people whom she meets on her way.

Cast
Laura Flores as María Fernanda de Santiago
Alejandro Ibarra as Jesús García
Andrea Lagunés as Isabel "Chabelita" Arredondo de Santiago
Mercedes Molto as Lucrecia Samaniego de Sotomayor
Pilar Montenegro as Arcelia Olmos
Evita Muñoz "Chachita"† as Lolita
Martha Roth as Dalila
Irán Eory† as Mother Superior
Jaime Garza as Detective Romo
Raúl Araiza as Guillermo Contreras
Adalberto Martínez as Resortes
Alicia Montoya† as Trinidad "Trini"
Martha Ofelia Galindo as Leocadia
Carmen Amezcua as Sister Marcela
Vanessa Angers as Coral
Socorro Bonilla as Prudencia de Olmos
Juan Carlos Casasola as Román Correa
Rafael del Villar as Gilberto
Carmelita González as Malbina
Elizabeth Dupeyrón as Florencia
Roberto Ramírez Garza as Plácido
Pilar Escalante as Mirta
Isaura Espinoza as Desdémona Mayoral
Héctor Herrera as Zósimo Centella "Papadzul"
Luisa Huertas as Sister Cándida
Isabel Martínez "La Tarabilla" as Candelaria
Raquel Morell as Bernarda de Santiago
Gerardo Murguía as Ricardo Sotomayor
Héctor Sáez as Sócrates Olmos
Vilma Traca as Sister Lucha
María Clara Zurita as Justa Quiñones Monsalve
Niurka Marcos as Constanza
Guillermo Zarur as Clemente
Adriana Fonseca as Paola
Miguel de León as Ulises Arredondo
Paulina Álvarez as Juliana
Carla Ortiz as Karina
Julio Alemán as Juez
Guillermo Aguilar as Father Cristóbal
Joaquin Cordero as Patriarca
Eduardo Liñán as Lic. Constantino Contreras
Paty Díaz as Lorena
Daniela Luján as Daniela
Ximena Sariñana as Enriqueta
Paulina Martell as Genoveva
Andrea Soberón as Flavia/Fabiola Rivera Ostos
Michelle González as Nuria
Priscilla Greco as Clara Antonia
Monserrat de León as Clara Antonia (Ep.1)
Annie del Castillo as Rosy
Natasha Dupeyrón as Loreta
Rosita Bouchot as Professor Leoncia
Javier Herranz as Francisco
Sergio Blass as Vilko
Estela Barona as Yanka
Ramón Menéndez as Augusto Arredondo
Teo Tapia as Octavio de Santiago
Vanessa Villela as Naida
José Luis Cantú as Tacho
Ricardo Vera as Evaristo
Héctor Soberón as Dr. Alberto
Ana Karla Kegel as Pilar
Elena Paola Kegel as Socorro

Broadcast in other countries 
The series was aired in the Philippines through ABS-CBN in 1999-2000 as Chabelita. It was also aired in Indonesia through SCTV in 1999 as Impian Chabelita, with the dubbing and the soundtrack turned into Indonesian as the Indonesian duo singer Saskia dan Geovani.

References

External links

1998 telenovelas
Mexican telenovelas
1998 Mexican television series debuts
1998 Mexican television series endings
Television series about orphans
Television shows set in Mexico City
Televisa telenovelas
Children's telenovelas
Mexican television series based on Brazilian television series
Spanish-language telenovelas